Parkroyal Collection Pickering, Singapore (stylised as the PARKROYAL COLLECTION Pickering, Singapore, formerly PARKROYAL on Pickering) is a luxury hotel located in the Central Area, Singapore.

History
	
Parkroyal on Pickering was opened in 2013.

Architecture
The hotel was designed by WOHA, a Singapore-based architecture firm. Designed to be a "hotel-in-a-garden", Parkroyal on Pickering features extensive greenery, including green walls, water features and 15,000 square meters of tiered "sky gardens".

The hotel's sky gardens are self-sustaining and consume minimal energy through the usage of solar cells, motion sensors, rainwater harvesting and reclaimed water.

Facilities
Parkroyal on Pickering has 367 rooms and suits. The fifth floor of the hotel is a "wellness floor" with a day spa, fitness centre, infinity pool and garden. The hotel also has a restaurant and bar called LIME.

In popular culture
The hotel is featured in HBO series Westworld, as part of the third season.

Awards
 2016 Singapore Institute of Architects (SIA) Architectural Design Awards – Design Award (commercial category)
 2015 CTBUH Skyscraper Award – Urban Habitat Award
 2015 Singapore Experience Awards – Business Event Venue of the Year
 2014 Australian Institute of Architects International Chapter Architecture Awards – International Architecture Award (commercial category)
 2014 German Design Council Iconic Awards – Best of Best Award (public category)
 2014 Good Design Award – Green Good Design Award
 2013 INSIDE World Festival of Interiors – Best Interior Design (hotels category)
 2013 World Architecture News (WAN) Awards – Hotel of the Year
 2013 President's Design Award – Design of the Year

References

External links

Hotel buildings completed in 2013
Hotels in Singapore
Downtown Core (Singapore)
2013 establishments in Singapore
WOHA